Cagno is an Italian surname. Notable people with the surname include:

Alessandro Cagno (1883–1971), Italian racing driver, aviation pioneer, and powerboat racer
Gregg Cagno (born 1969), American songwriter and performer

Italian-language surnames